Double Mountain may refer to one of two mountains in the United States:

Double Mountain (California), the highest point of the Tehachapi Mountains in California
Double Mountains (Texas), the highest point in Stonewall County, Texas and notably isolated peak

Double Mountain may also refer to:
Double Mountain Fork Brazos River, a tributary of the Brazos River, Texas